The East Herts Miniature Railway (EHMR) is situated in the Van Hage Garden Centre, Great Amwell near Ware, Hertfordshire. It opened in 1978 and by 2006 had carried 1 million passengers. As of 2022, the railway has carried more than 2 million people over its forty year history. The railway is popular with locals.

The current length of the track is around 1/4 of a mile. The site comprises a station with canopy and booking office, bridge, engine shed, tunnel, turntable, signal box (with ex London Underground Westinghouse 'B' style lever frame from Hyde Park Corner), steaming bays, level crossing, water tower and workshop.

References

External links
 Official website

7¼ in gauge railways in England
Tourist attractions in Hertfordshire
Miniature railways in the United Kingdom